Islamic Centre may refer to:

 Islamic Centre of England
 Islamic Centre (Maldives)